Kayla is a feminine given name. Notable people with the name include:

 Ryan Ackroyd, British computer hacker who posed as a female known as Kayla
 Kayla Bashore Smedley (born 1983), American field hockey player
 Kayla Blake (born 1963), American actress
 Kayla Clarke (born 1991), Australian swimmer
 Kayla Cullen (born 1992), New Zealand netball player
 Kayla DiCello (born 2004), American gymnast
 Kayla Ewell (born 1985), American actress
 Kayla Harrison (born 1990), American judoka
 Kayla Hoffman (born 1988), American artistic gymnast
 Kayla Itsines (born 1991), American author, entrepreneur, and personal trainer
 Kayla Kessinger (born 1993), American politician from West Virginia
 Kayla Martell (born 1989), American beauty queen
 Kayla McAlister (born 1988), New Zealand netball player
 Kayla Moore (born 1961), American president of Foundation for Moral Law
 Kayla Mueller (1988–2015), American human rights activist
 Kayla Parker (1971–2007), American musician
 Kayla Pedersen (born 1989), American basketball player
 Kayla Reeves (born 1992), American musician
 Kayla Rolland (1993–2000), American child shot and killed by another child
 Kayla Sharland (born 1985), New Zealand field hockey player
 Kayla Sims (born 1999), American YouTuber
 Kayla Standish (born 1989), American basketball player
 Kayla Stra (born 1984), Australian jockey
 Kayla Tausche (born 1986), American broadcast journalist
 Kayla Williams (author) (born 1976), American writer
 Kayla Williams (gymnast) (born 1993), American artistic gymnast

Fictional Character 

 Kayla Morgan, from Cloud 9
 Kayla Knowles, a daughter of Apollo from Rick Riordan's The Trials of Apollo.
 Kayla, from Tom and Jerry.

See also 

 Cayla (disambiguation)
 Kalla (name)
 McKayla Maroney

English feminine given names